Eassalu is a village in Audru Parish, Pärnu County, in southwestern Estonia. It has a population of 32 (as of 1 January 2011).

Eassalu is bordered by the Nätsi-Võlla Nature Reserve on its northern, western and northwestern sides.

References

Villages in Pärnu County